Orr Sten Evert Eriksson (born 19 January 1935) is a retired Swedish biathlete. He competed in the 20 km event at the 1964 Winter Olympics and finished 25th.

References

1935 births
Living people
Biathletes at the 1964 Winter Olympics
Olympic biathletes of Sweden
Swedish male biathletes
20th-century Swedish people